Choi Hyo-Jin (born 18 August 1983) is South Korean retired football player who used to play as a right wingback.

Club career statistics

International career
Results list South Korea's goal tally first.

NB: Friendly match against Poland (on 7 October 2011) was not full A-match.

Honors

Club
Incheon United
K League 1 Runner-up : 2005

Pohang Steelers
K League 1 Winner : 2007
Korean FA Cup
Winner : 2008
Runner-up : 2007
League Cup Winner : 2009
AFC Champions League Winner : 2009

FC Seoul
K League 1
Winners (2): 2010, 2012
League Cup
Winners (1): 2010
AFC Champions League 
Runner-up : 2013
Korean FA Cup
Runner-up : 2014

Individual
Korean FA Cup MVP : 2008
K-League Best XI : 2008, 2009, 2010

References

External links
 
 Choi Hyo-jin ? National Team Stats at KFA 
 
 

1983 births
Living people
Association football fullbacks
South Korean footballers
South Korea international footballers
2011 AFC Asian Cup players
Incheon United FC players
Pohang Steelers players
FC Seoul players
Gimcheon Sangmu FC players
Jeonnam Dragons players
K League 1 players
K League 2 players
Ajou University alumni